Vitali Vitalyevich Pyanchenko (born 11 February 1980) is a Russian professional football coach and a former player. He is the goalkeepers' coach for FC Yenisey Krasnoyarsk.

Club career
He played in the Russian Football National League for FC Metallurg Krasnoyarsk in 2006.

References

External links
 

1980 births
Living people
Russian footballers
Association football goalkeepers
FC Dynamo Kirov players
FC Yenisey Krasnoyarsk players
FC Gornyak Uchaly players
FC Tyumen players